The Pacific saury (Cololabis saira) is a member of the family Scomberesocidae. Saury is a seafood  in several East Asian cuisines and is also known by the name mackerel pike.

Biology 
Saury is a fish with a small mouth, an elongated body, a series of small finlets between the dorsal and anal fins, and a small forked tail. The fish's color is dark green to blue on the dorsal surface, silvery below, and there are small, bright blue blotches distributed randomly on the sides. 

It is about 25-30 cm long when caught, but it can grow up to 40 cm long and is about 180 grams when caught in the autumn. Saury will be at most four years old.  Saury is a pelagic fish and wants to stay close to the surface and is caught there, but it can also be down to a depth of up to 230 m. When saury is escaping from predators, it floats on the surface and is similar to other fish within the genus.

These pelagic schooling fish are found in the North Pacific, from China, Korea and Japan eastward to the Gulf of Alaska and southward to subtropical Mexico, preferring temperatures around 15 – 18 °C. Pacific saury is usually found near the surface (though they may have a depth range of 0 – 230 m).

The Pacific saury is a highly migratory species. Adults are generally found offshore, near the surface of the ocean, in schools. Juveniles associate with drifting seaweed. Pacific saury are oviparous. Eggs are attached to floating objects, such as seaweed, via filaments on the shell surface.

The saury feeds on zooplankton, such as copepods, krill, amphipods, and the eggs and larvae of common fish, such as anchovies, due to their lack of stomach, and their short straight intestines . The internal organs of the saury may contain small, red, earthworm-like parasites named Rhadinorhynchus selkirki; these are harmless.

A few of the natural predators of Pacific saury include marine mammals, squid and tuna.

Saury oil contains considerable levels of n-3 unsaturated fatty acids (PUFA) and long-chain monounsaturated fatty acids (LCMUFA) with aliphatic tails longer than 18 carbons.

Japan 
Pacific saury is known as sanma (さんま / サンマ / 秋刀魚) and saira (さいら / サイラ /佐伊羅) in Japanese. 

Saira is the fish's local name in the Kii Peninsula region of Japan. The Kanji used in the Japanese name of the fish (秋刀魚) literally translates as "autumn knife fish," as its body shape resembles a katana. 

Saury is one of the most prominent seasonal foods representing autumn in Japanese cuisine. It is most commonly served salted and grilled (broiled) whole, garnished with daikon oroshi (grated daikon) and served alongside a bowl of rice and a bowl of miso soup. Other condiments may include soy sauce, sudachi, lime, lemon, or other citrus juices. The intestines are bitter, but many people choose not to gut the fish, as many say its bitterness, balanced by the condiments, is part of the enjoyment.

It also has many small bones, though not as many as sardines. Saury festivals are held in various parts of Japan (for example, Meguro Sanma).

Sanma sashimi is becoming increasingly available but is not common. Although rarely used for sushi, sanma-zushi is a regional delicacy along parts of the Kii Peninsula, especially along the coast of southern Mie Prefecture. It is prepared by pickling the saury in salt and vinegar (depending on the region, bitter orange or citron vinegar may be used), and then placing it on top of vinegared rice to create the finished sushi.

The fish can also be pan-fried or canned kabayaki.

Some saury has a yellow tail and mouth, and in rare cases, saury with a yellow body can be caught. These are traded at high prices as high-end fish. The reason why the saury turns yellow has not yet been determined.

When cooked as grilled fish, it does not have large scales to be removed, and since it is rare to take out internal organs and gills, it is easy to handle without the need for a kitchen knife. It is sometimes referred to as an introductory fresh fish in cooking books.

Korea 

kkongchi (꽁치) in Korean, Gwamegi is a Korean dish of half-dried Pacific saury made during winter. It is mostly eaten in the region of North Gyeongsang Province in places such as Pohang, Uljin, and Yeongdeok, where a large amount of the fish are harvested.

Simmered saury (꽁치조림, kkongchi-jorim) is a common variety of jorim, Korean traditional simmered foods.

Salt-grilled saury is known as kkongchi gui (꽁치구이) in Korea.

China 
Pinyin: qiū dāo yú in Chinese (秋刀鱼 in Simplified Chinese or 秋刀魚 in Traditional Chinese),

Russia 

Saira (сайра) in Russian. Pacific saury is popular in Russia, which directly access the Pacific Ocean. In Russia, it is sold canned with salt and spice, sometimes with the addition of vegetable oil or tomato sauce. It is also eaten smoked.

United Kingdom 
Pacific saury is used as bait for pike and sea fishing. In the UK, they are usually called blueys, possibly due to people confusing the Pacific saury with blue mackerel.

Fishing 
Around 1950, Japan caught about 98% of the catch and South Korea about 2%, but Japan's catch share has decreased proportionally in recent decades. Other nations that fish saury now include China and Taiwan. The Soviet Union fished saury around 1960 until the dissolution of the country. Taiwan began fishing for saury around 1988 and has been expanding its catch. In 2002, the Chinese also started fishing for saury, and they have been catching over 100,000 tons a year.

Gallery

References

Cololabis
Commercial fish
Fish of the Pacific Ocean
Japanese seafood
Japanese cuisine
Korean cuisine
Russian cuisine
Soviet cuisine
Fish of Korea
Fish described in 1856
Taxa named by J. Carson Brevoort